Defending Our Lives is a 1993 American short documentary film directed by Margaret Lazarus, Stacey Kabat and Renner Wunderlich. It won an Oscar at the 66th Academy Awards in 1994 for Documentary Short Subject.

See also
Domestic Violence Documentaries
 The Conspiracy of Silence, a Public Broadcasting Station (PBS) documentary
 Power and Control: Domestic Violence in America, a documentary about domestic violence and the community-based Duluth Model to reduce domestic violence
 Silent Voices, a United Kingdom documentary
 Sin by Silence, a documentary

References

External links
Defending Our Lives at Cambridge Documentary Films

1993 films
1993 documentary films
1993 independent films
1993 short films
American short documentary films
Best Documentary Short Subject Academy Award winners
American independent films
Films about domestic violence
Documentary films about violence against women
1990s English-language films
1990s American films